George Garth (1733–1819) was a British General, a commander in the American Revolutionary War, and Colonel of the 17th Regiment of Foot.

Life
He was son of John Garth MP and Rebecca, the daughter of John Brompton and granddaughter of Sir Richard Raynsford, Lord Chief Justice of the King's Bench.

He joined the Army and served for 37 years in the 1st Regiment of Foot Guards.

Garth served as second-in-command to William Tryon, during the attack on New Haven, Connecticut, in the summer of 1779 when on 5 July his forces landed at West Haven, while those of Tryon landed at East Haven.

In 1789 he was promoted Lieutenant-Colonel of his regiment and in 1792 transferred as Colonel to the 17th (Leicestershire) Regiment of Foot, which post he held to his death. He was promoted to the rank of General in 1810 and later became Lieutenant Governor of Placentia, Newfoundland.

He died in 1819 in Beverley, Yorkshire at the age of 86, and is buried in St. Mary's Church, Beverley.

Family
Brother; General Thomas Garth (1744–1829) chief equerry to King George III
Brother; Charles Garth MP (abt 1734–1784) Member of Parliament, Crown Agent for South Carolina in pre-Revolutionary War America

References

The Naval History of Great Britain from the Earliest Period William Goldsmith 1825 (page 630)
The Gentlemans Magazine 1830 (Page 85)
Notes and Queries 1862 (Page 372)
The Pictorial Field-book of the Revolution, 1851, Benson John Lossing, Page 422

1733 births
1819 deaths
British Army generals
British Army personnel of the American Revolutionary War
Grenadier Guards officers